The European Weightlifting Federation (EWF) was founded in 1969, and is the body governing and organizing the European Weightlifting Championships. The EWF is a  "recognized continental body" under the International Weightlifting Federation (IWF).  Following the 2022 Russian invasion of Ukraine, the EWF took away from Russia the right to host the European Youth Weightlifting Championships in Russia in August 2022.

Events

Members

References

External links
 European Weightlifting Federation on Facebook

Organizations based in Chișinău
International sports organizations
Weightlifting
Sports organizations established in 1969
1969 establishments in Europe